The 1957 French Championships (now known as the French Open) was a tennis tournament that took place on the outdoor clay courts at the Stade Roland-Garros in Paris, France. The tournament ran from 21 May until 1 June. It was the 61st staging of the French Championships, and the second Grand Slam tennis event of 1957. Sven Davidson and Shirley Bloomer won the singles titles.

Finals

Men's singles

 Sven Davidson defeated  Herbert Flam 6–3, 6–4, 6–4

Women's singles

 Shirley Bloomer defeated  Dorothy Head Knode 6–1, 6–3

Men's doubles

 Malcolm Anderson /  Ashley Cooper defeated  Don Candy /  Mervyn Rose  6–3, 6–0, 6–3

Women's doubles

 Shirley Bloomer /  Darlene Hard defeated  Yola Ramírez /  Rosie Reyes 7–5, 4–6, 7–5

Mixed doubles

 Věra Pužejová /  Jiří Javorský defeated  Edda Buding /  Luis Ayala  6–3, 6–4

References

External links
 French Open official website

French Championships
French Championships (tennis) by year
French Championships (tennis)
French Championships (tennis)
French Championships (tennis)
French Championships (tennis)